Emilio Ambasz (born June 13, 1943, in Resistencia, Chaco, Argentina) is an Argentinian-US architect and award-winning industrial designer. From 1969 to 1976 he was Curator of Design at the Museum of Modern Art, in New York. Ambasz has been labeled as "the father, poet, and prophet" of the green architecture by Japanese architect Tadao Ando.

Ambasz's trademark style is a combination of buildings and gardens, which he describes as 'green over grey'. He bucked the trends of the 1970s, hiding his buildings under grass or putting them on boats.

The MOMA established in 2020 the Emilio Ambasz Institute for the Joint Study of the Built and the Natural Environment. Curator, writer, and educator, Carson Chan was appointed as its first director.

Life and education
Born in Argentina (13 June 1943, Resistencia, Chaco), Ambasz is also a citizen of Spain by Royal Grant. He studied at Princeton University where he completed the undergraduate program in one year and earned, the next year, a master's degree in architecture from the same institution.

Career
Ambasz served as Curator of Design at the Museum of Modern Art, in New York (1969–76), where he directed and installed numerous exhibits on architecture and industrial design, among them Italy: The New Domestic Landscape, in 1972; The Architecture of Luis Barragan, in 1974; and The Taxi Project, in 1976; and authored their publications.

Ambasz was a two-term President of the Architectural League (1981–85). He taught at Princeton University's School of Architecture, and was visiting professor at the Hochschule für Gestaltung in Ulm, Germany.

Among his architectural projects are the Grand Rapids Art Museum in Michigan, winner of the 1976 Progressive Architecture Award; a house for a couple in Cordoba, Spain, winner of the 1980 Progressive Architecture Award; and the Conservatory at the San Antonio Botanical Center in Texas, winner of the 1985 Progressive Architecture Award, the 1988 National Glass Association Award for Excellence in Commercial Design, and the 1990 Quaternario Award.

He also won the First Prize and Gold Medal ex aequo in the competition to design the Master Plan for the Universal Exhibition of 1992, which took place in Seville, Spain, to celebrate the 500th anniversary of America's discovery.

The headquarters designed for the Financial Guaranty Insurance Company of New York won the Grand Prize of the 1987 International Interior Design Award of the United Kingdom, as well as the 1986 IDEA Award from the Industrial Designers Society of America. He won the First Prize in the 1986 competition for the Urban Plan for the Eschenheimer Tower in Frankfurt, Germany. His Banque Bruxelles Lambert in Lausanne, Switzerland, received the 1983 Annual Interiors Award.

Ambasz represented the United States at the 1976 Venice Biennale. In 2021, the Italian Pavilion at the Biennale paid tribute to Ambasz's creations as an inspiration for modern-era sustainable architecture.

Since 1980 until 2008 Ambasz has been the Chief Design Consultant for the Cummins Engine Co. He holds 220 industrial and mechanical design patents, and his Vertebrax chair is included in the Design Collections of the Museum of Modern Art and the Metropolitan Museum of Art, New York. The MOMA has also included in its Design Collection his 1967 3-D Poster Geigy Graphics and his Flashlight, among more than 20 other pieces.

Ambasz is the author of several books on architecture and design, among them Natural Architecture, Artificial Design, first published by Electa in 2001 and re-published four times since in expanded versions. "I detest writing theories. I prefer writing fables," he said in 2017. Domus magazine has published some of those fables, including this one:"Italy has remained a federation of city-states. There are museum-cities and factory-cities. There is a city whose streets are made of water, and another where all streets are hollowed walls. There is one city where all its inhabitants work on the manufacture of equipment for amusement parks; a second where everybody makes shoes; and a third where all its dwellers build baroque furniture. There are many cities where they still make a living by baking bread and bottling wine, and one where they continue to package faith and transact with guilt. Naturally, there is also one city inhabited solely by architects and designers. This city is laid out on a grid, its blocks are square, and each is totally occupied by a cubic building. Its wails are blind, without windows or doors.The inhabitants of this city pride themselves on being radically different from each other. Visitors to the city claim, however, that all inhabitants have one common trait; they are all unhappy with the city they inherited and moreover, concur that it is possible to divide the citizens into several distinct groups. The members of one of the groups live inside the building blocks. Conscious of the impossibility of communicating with others, each of them, in the isolation of his own block, builds and demolishes every day, a new physical setting. To these constructions they sometimes give forms which they recover from their private memories; on other occasions, these constructs are intended to represent what they envision communal life may be on the outside.Another group dwells in the streets. Both as individuals and as members of often conflicting sub-groups, they have one common goal: to destroy the blocks that define the streets. For that purpose they march along chanting invocations, or write on the walls words and symbols which they believe are endowed with the power to bring about their will. There is one group whose members sit on top of the buildings. There they await the emergence of the first blade of grass from the roof that will announce the arrival of the Millennium. As of late, rumors have been circulating that some members of the group dwelling in the streets have climbed up to the buildings' roof-tops, hoping that from this vantage point they could be able to see whether the legendary people of the countryside have begun their much predicted march against the city, or whether they have opted to build a new city beyond the boundaries of the old one."In the winter of 2011–12, Ambasz architectural, industrial, and graphic design work was exhibited at the Museo Nacional Centro de Arte Reina Sofía, Madrid, in a comprehensive major retrospective of his complete works. In 2017, Lars Mueller Publishers issued a much improved version in English (Emerging Nature: Precursor of Architecture and Design) of the book issued on the occasion of that exhibition.

The American Institute of Architects admitted him to Honorary Fellowship in recognition of distinguished achievement in the profession of architecture in May 2007. He is also an Honorary International Fellow of the Royal Institute of British Architects.

In June, 2021, Ambasz was awarded an honorary degree in Building Engineering and Architecture by the University of Bologna (Italy) as a "trailblazer" for green architecture, In September 2020 Emilio Ambasz won his fourth Compasso d'Oro, for his outstanding career "as a pioneer of the relationship between buildings and nature."

Exhibitions of works
 1983 Emilio Ambasz: 10 Years of Architecture, Graphic and Industrial Design, a circulating show presented in Milan, Madrid, and Zurich
 1985 Emilio Ambasz, The Axis Design and Architecture Gallery, Tokyo
 1986 Emilio Ambasz, Institute of Contemporary Art of Geneva at HaIle Sud, Switzerland
 1987 Emilio Ambasz, Arc-en- Ciel Gallery at the Center of Contemporary Art, Bordeaux, France
 1989 Emilio Ambasz: Architecture, one-man show at The Museum of Modern Art, New York
 1989 Emilio Ambasz: Architecture, Exhibition, Industrial and Graphic Design, a circulating one man show presented in San Diego Museum of Contemporary Art, the Musée des Arts Décoratifs de Montreal, the Akron Art Museum in Ohio, the Art Institute of Chicago in Illinois, and the Laumeier Sculpture Park in St. Louis
 1993 Emilio Ambasz, one-man show, Tokyo Station Contemporary Center, Japan
 1994 Emilio Ambasz, Architecture and Design, one-man show at the Centro Cultural Arte Contemporáneo in Mexico City.
2005-2006 In-Depth: The House of Spiritual Retreat by Emilio Ambasz, at The Museum of Modern Art, New York.
 2009 In Situ:Architecture and Landscape, a group show at The Museum of Modern Art, New York
 2010 Green over Gray, one-man show at the Grimaldi Forum, Monaco
 2011-2012 Emilio Ambasz: Inventions – Architecture and Design; a comprehensive major retrospective, at the Centro Nacional de Arte Contemporáneo Reina Sofia, Madrid, Spain

Publications by Ambasz
 1972 Ambasz, Emilio, ed.: Italy: The New Domestic Landscape: Achievements and Problems of Italian Design. The Museum of Modern Art, New York.
 1976 Ambasz, Emilio, ed.: The Taxi Project: Realistic Solutions for Today. The Museum of Modern Art, New York.
 1976 Ambasz, Emilio: The architecture of Luis Barragàn. The Museum of Modern Art, New York.
 1999 Ambasz, Emilio: Shigeru Ban. Lawrence King Publishing, London.
 2004 Ambasz, Emilio: Analyzing Ambasz. The Monacelli Press, New York.
 2006 Ambasz, Emilio, ed.: The Universitas Project: Solutions for a Post-Technological Society. The Museum of Modern Art, New York.

Publications about Ambasz
 1989 Emilio Ambasz: The Poetics of the Pragmatic: Architecture, Exhibit, Industrial and Graphic Design. Rizzoli International Publications, New York.
 1993 Emilio Ambasz: Inventions: The Reality of the ldeal. Rizzoli International Publications, New York.
 1999 Architettura e Natura: Emilio Ambasz – Progetti & Oggetti. Electa, Milan
 2001 Emilio Ambasz: Natural Architecture, Artificial Design. Electa, Milan.
 2005 Emilio Ambasz: A Technological Arcadia, by Fulvio Irace. Electa, Milan.
 2005 Emilio Ambasz: Casa de Retiro Espiritual, by Peter Buchanan and Michele Alassio. Electa, Milan.
 2010 Emilio Ambasz: Architecture & Nature, Design & Artifice / Architecture & Nature, Design & Artifice. Electa Mondador, Milan.
 2011 Emilio Ambasz. Invenciones: arquitectura y diseño. Museo Reina Sofía, Madrid.
 2011 Maestros de la Arquitectura. Emilio Ambasz, by Mónica Colombo. Editorial Salvat, Barcelona.
 2017 Emerging Nature - Emilio Ambasz: Precursor of Architecture and Design, Lars Muller Publishers, Zurich, Switzerland.
 2021 Emilio Ambasz: Green Architecture & Design Tales / Architettura verde & favole di design, curated by Fulvio Irace. Corraini Edizione, Mantova.
 2022 Emilio Ambasz: Curating a New Nature, by Barry Bergdoll. Rizzoli, New York.

References

 Pile, John F., ed.: "Ambasz, Emilio." The Grove Dictionary of Art, http://www.groveart.com/ (March, 2000).
 Rafael Ordóñez: Emilio Ambasz: un genio desconocido.

Further reading
Mario Bellini, Alessandro Mendini, Michael Sorkin, Ettore Sottsass: Emilio Ambasz: The Poetics of the Pragmatic, Rizzoli, 1989
Emilio Ambasz, Michael Sorkin: Analyzing Ambasz, The Monacelli Press, 2004

External links

 
 Emilio Ambasz & Associates, Inc.
 Emilio Ambasz, Industrial Design

Living people
1943 births
Argentine architects
Argentine expatriates in the United States
Princeton University School of Architecture alumni
Compasso d'Oro Award recipients